Real Love is an album by the American R&B duo Ashford & Simpson, released in 1986 via Capitol Records.

The album peaked at No. 74 on the Billboard 200. It was nominated for a Grammy Award, in the "Best R&B Performance by a Duo or Group with Vocal" category.

Production
All tracks from the album were written and produced by Ashford & Simpson. Stevie Wonder contributed a harmonica solo to "Nobody Walks in L.A."

Critical reception

The Washington Post declared that Ashford & Simpson "haven't lost their knack for knockout hooks, and they have a talent for telling tales to suit the top ten." Robert Christgau wrote that "not even 'Nobody Walks in L.A.', which makes good on its title but is too quirky and local for a single, takes it on home." The Los Angeles Times thought that "Count Your Blessings" possesses "the slick, black adult-contemporary sound that has become Ashford and Simpson’s stock in trade." The Gazette called the album "more seamless songs of love, loss and inspiration from the yuppies of soul."

Track listing
All tracks composed by Ashford and Simpson

Personnel
Nickolas Ashford - vocals
Valerie Simpson - vocals, synthesizer
Francisco Centeno - bass
Joseph Joubert - synthesizer, arrangements
Ivan Hampden - drums
Jimmy Simpson - percussion, recording supervisor
Vinny Della Rocca - saxophone
Ray Simpson, Ullanda McCullough - backing vocals
Stevie Wonder - harmonica in "Nobody Walks in L.A."

References

1986 albums
Ashford & Simpson albums
Capitol Records albums